Xavier Malisse was the defending champion but lost in the final 6–3, 3–6, 7–6(7–5) against Tommy Haas.

Seeds

  Andre Agassi (quarterfinals)
  Robby Ginepri (first round)
  Xavier Malisse (final)
  Tommy Haas (champion)
  Wesley Moodie (first round)
  Florian Mayer (quarterfinals)
  Gilles Müller (quarterfinals)
  Vince Spadea (semifinals)

Draw

Finals

Top half

Bottom half

External links
 2006 Delray Beach International Tennis Championships Main Draw
 2006 Delray Beach International Tennis Championships Qualifying Draw

Singles
2006 ATP Tour